An Ideal Husband is an 1895 comedic stage play by Oscar Wilde.

An Ideal Husband may also refer to the following adaptations:

 An Ideal Husband (1935 film), starring Brigitte Helm and Sybille Schmitz
 An Ideal Husband (1947 film), starring Paulette Goddard and Michael Wilding
 An Ideal Husband (1980 film), starring Lyudmila Gurchenko and Yury Yakovlev 
 An Ideal Husband (1999 film), starring Julianne Moore and Rupert Everett
 An Ideal Husband (2000 film), featuring Sadie Frost and James Wilby